Procchio is a village in Tuscany, central Italy, administratively a frazione of the comune of Marciana, province of Livorno. At the time of the 2011 census its population was 441.

Procchio is located on the Elba Island and it is about 10 km from Marciana.

Bibliography 
 
 

Frazioni of the Province of Livorno